USS Lancetfish (SS-296), a Balao-class submarine, was the only ship of the United States Navy to be named for the lancetfish (Alepisaurus ferox), a large voracious, deep sea fish having long lancetlike teeth and a high long dorsal fin.

Her keel was laid down on 30 September 1942 by Cramp Shipbuilding Company of Philadelphia. She was launched on 15 August 1943 sponsored by Miss Beatrice P. Barker, towed to Boston Navy Yard 19 May 1944 for completion, and commissioned 12 February 1945.

While tied up alongside Pier 8, Lancetfish flooded through an aft torpedo tube and sank 15 March 1945. She was raised eight days later and decommissioned 24 March. Assigned to the Atlantic Reserve Fleet in uncompleted condition, she was transferred to the First Naval District 27 February 1947 and was assigned to the New London Group 9 December 1952.  She was struck from the Naval Vessel Register on 9 June 1958 and sold for scrap for $57,189 on 20 August 1959 having never gone to sea on patrol, to Yale Waste Company, Boston, Massachusetts.

Although Lancetfish was commissioned at the time of her sinking, she never saw active service, and she is not counted among the 52 American submarines lost during World War II.

References

External links
 Photo gallery at navsource.org

Balao-class submarines
World War II submarines of the United States
Ships built by William Cramp & Sons
1943 ships
Maritime incidents in March 1945
United States submarine accidents